GOSR2-related progressive myoclonus ataxia, also known as Progressive myoclonic epilepsy type 6 is a rare genetic type of progressive myoclonus ataxia which is characterized by progressive myoclonic epilepsy with an early onset which is associated with generalized tonic-clonic seizures, petit mal seizures, and drop attacks, variable degrees of scoliosis, areflexia, high levels of creatine kinase serum, and late-onset cognitive decline.

According to OMIM, only 12 cases have been described in medical literature. It is caused by autosomal recessive loss of function mutations in the (as the name implies) GOSR2 gene, in chromosome 17.

References 

Genetic diseases and disorders